Łukasz Uhma (born 20 January 1954) is a Polish gymnast. He competed in eight events at the 1976 Summer Olympics.

References

1954 births
Living people
Polish male artistic gymnasts
Olympic gymnasts of Poland
Gymnasts at the 1976 Summer Olympics
Gymnasts from Warsaw